KFC (肯德基; pinyin: Kěndéjī) is a fast-food restaurant chain founded by Colonel Harland Sanders in Salt Lake City, Utah, in 1952. KFC specializes in selling fried chicken and is known to have diversified the fast-food market by challenging the dominance of the chicken burger. In 1930, at the age of 40 Colonel Sanders bought a roadside motel in Corbin, Kentucky to sell his southern style chicken. By 1939, he had created his blend of 11 herbs and spices that are still used in the recipes today. In 1950, the colonel became an icon by regularly wearing his white suit in public. 1952 marks the opening of the first Kentucky Fried Chicken franchise in Salt Lake City, Utah. In 1957, the original KFC bucket became recognized worldwide. Due to the rapid growth of KFC, Colonel Sanders sold his company to a group of investors in 1964 and moved to Canada for the remainder of his life.

KFC was sold to Heublein in the 1970s and was later sold to PepsiCo then spun off, along with other fast-food chains owned by the company, to become Yum! Brands in 1997. KFC restaurants in China are owned or franchised by Yum China, a restaurant company that also owns the Pizza Hut and Taco Bell chains in China and was spun off from Yum! Brands in 2016.

As of September 2021, KFC has over 8,100 outlets over 1,600 cities across China.

According to research by Millward Brown, KFC was the most powerful foreign brand in China in 2013.

History
KFC became the first Western fast-food company in China after its first outlet opened in Qianmen, Beijing, in November 1987. It was China's first introduction to franchising. China proceeded to adopt the franchise and it grew rapidly. The operation was a joint venture, with a 60 percent stake held by KFC, 27 percent by the Beijing Tourist Bureau and 13 percent by Beijing Food Production. In early 1988, Bank of China took a 25 percent stake in the venture, and KFC's original stake was diluted to 51 percent.

Warren Liu, a former vice-president of Tricon Global Restaurants (KFC's former parent company) argued that "being the first... has continued to provide KFC with a substantial competitive advantage." By 1988 the Beijing outlet had the highest volume sales of any KFC in the world.

Instead of importing American managers, KFC hired management from rising Asian economies such as Taiwan. Existing Chinese distribution infrastructure was poor or non-existent, so KFC created its own, which ensured high quality standards. The founding leadership were known as "Taiwan Gang" because they were from Taiwan. The team was filled with veterans in the fast food industry with up to 10 years of experience before joining. They were knowledgeable of Chinese culture and formed local partnerships to come up with localized menus and management practices despite being educated in the west. The chain had an early advantage against its Western fast food rivals, as fried chicken has been a staple Chinese dish since antiquity, whereas hamburgers were foreign and relatively unknown.

Taiwanese businessman Tony Wang was hired by KFC in 1975 to work as a business analyst. Wang met with the mayor of Tianjin city, Li Ruihuan, and was asked to teach him how to start a fast-food business. Wang used his newfound knowledge to successfully open his business in Tianjin, Orchid Food, and KFC became interested in having him lead the expansion of KFC in China. Although KFC had success with international expansion in countries like Southeast Asia, Singapore, Indonesia, Malaysia, and Thailand, they struggled to integrate into China. Wang's journey of expanding into China was riddled with problems. KFC was stuck with using chilled chicken since they did not have a transport system for the chicken, since China only had coarse-grained salt while KFC used fine-grain salt.  According to Wang, In addition to ingredients, "...skilled labor was hard to find and training the staff was very tedious". Despite the struggle, Wang was able to open 5 outlets by the time he left KFC in 1990.

By 1994, there were 28 KFC outlets in China, including seven in Beijing. By 1997, there were 100 outlets.

By 2007, there were 2,000 outlets in 240 cities.

KFC would begin to expand north and west into China along with the central region. Eventually it covered all the provinces in China except for Tibet. The expansion of KFC was also continuously increasing in the cities that they already settled into.

In 2008, CEO David Novak announced plans to open more than 20,000 restaurants in China, saying: "We're in the first innings of a nine-innings ball game in China."

At the start of 2008, the chain added its first Chinese street food snack to its menu, the youtiao. The street snack menu was expanded in 2010 with the addition of the shaobing. In August 2010, KFC China announced its biggest product launch to date: the Rice Bowl, which heralded the arrival of rice as an accompaniment across the chain.

Early Obstacles 

KFC also faced some issues early on with some KFC stores getting wrecked by crowds protesting a mistaken bombing of the Chinese Embassy in 1999. In 2005, Sudan I was found in spice pickle powder which was used in some KFC menu items. The discovery was made by quality inspection authorities in Zhejiang Province. The items included spiced drumsticks, spiced chicken wings, popcorn chicken, and the "New Orleans Roasted Chicken". They were removed from the menu because the seasoning was a banned carcinogenic dye. Sudan I is an industrial dye used for coloring solvents, oil waxes, as well as shoes and floor polishes. The substance is not safe for use in foods because it increases the risk of cancer. The discovery led to the ban of all flavoring products made by Heinz-Meiweiyuan Food Co. 

Despite the scandal with the dye, KFC increased profits while opening hundreds of new stores during the same year. This success could be credited to the clever advertising aimed at Chinese audience and the knowledge of the Chinese market.

2012–2014 supply issues
In December 2012, the chain faced allegations that some of its suppliers injected antiviral drugs and growth hormones into poultry in ways that violated food safety regulations. This resulted in the chain severing its relationship with 100 suppliers and agreeing to "actively co-operate" with a government investigation into its use of antibiotics.

KFC China sales in January 2013 were down 41 percent against the previous year. In May 2013, Businessweek speculated that KFC may be "losing its touch" in China. Recovery has been slower than Yum! expected, with same store sales continuing to decline as late as October 2013, although the rate of decline is slowing. Leslie Patton of Businessweek also highlighted increased competition in the fast food category from competitors. To counter sluggish sales, the menu was revamped in 2014. In April 2014, Yum! announced that first quarter KFC sales had risen by 11 percent in China, following a 15 percent fall in 2013.

In July 2014, Chinese authorities closed down the Shanghai operations of the OSI Group, amidst allegations that it had supplied KFC with expired meat. Yum! immediately terminated its contract with the supplier and stated that the revelation had led to a "significant [and] negative" decline in sales.

Effect on people 
When KFC first arrived in China, it was not visited very frequently, but now the chain plays a crucial role in urban life. China's ad market started growing significantly during the 1980s with possibilities of exceeding the US ad market. With the growth of the ad market, brand names became a staple in China making big chains like KFC become more recognizable. The power of branding was able to reach even remote regions in China, with the help of the television spreading word of KFC.

KFC assisted with global modernization in China by connecting the chain with China customers. The appeal of the western lifestyle drew in customers and convinced them to spend 7 yuan for a meal at KFC despite the average monthly wage in Beijing being just 100 yuan a month. China was also becoming more accepting of Western influences with the new era. The typical Western approach to foreign expansion is to try to sell core products or services to as many different countries as possible.

McDonalds vs KFC 

KFC and McDonalds were the first American fast-food pioneers in the 1980s after foreign investments became more widely accepted under the economic reforms of Deng Xiaoping. McDonalds and KFC are major competitors in China despite being representatives of American fast-food industry. McDonalds entered China a little later than KFC in 1990. Similarly, to KFC, it adopted a joint venture with a state-owned enterprise, Beijing Corporation of Farming Industry and Commerce, and operated in Shenzhen. China has the largest number of fast-food consumers along with McDonalds and KFC dominating the fast-food market in China with a combined share that exceeds 90% of the market. The competition between the two brands was very beneficial to business in China.

With chicken as the core of KFC's menu, they had an advantage over the beef-based McDonalds. Chinese consumers consider pork and chicken as their top choices of meat to eat. Despite contentment with the original KFC menu items, they continuously produced localized items to satisfy their Chinese consumers. Some of these items include Chinese-styled porridge, Beijing Chicken Roll served with scallion and seafood sauce, Spicy Diced Chicken resembling Sichuan-styled dishes, and Chinese dough fritters. 

McDonalds aimed to make customers feel at home with their slogan, "Get together at McDonald’s; enjoy the happiness of family life". Despite working in the US, it failed to attract Chinese customers. KFC, however, adopted traditional Chinese themes in their commercials to attract customers. McDonalds is associated with western food while KFC is associated with locally adapted food. The two brands adopted different marketing strategies with McDonalds appealing to modern tastes and purposely maintaining a foreign feel and KFC adapting to local tastes and adapting to the Chinese culture. KFC's integration of both cultural proximity and genre proximity gave it an advantage over McDonalds on the market.

McDonalds' initial success in China was due to its genre proximity and ablility to provide a better service than local restaurants. The nutritional values and preparations were highly standardized compared to traditional Chinese fast food; McDonald's service was much faster than local businesses; McDonalds was much cleaner; and McDonalds utilized modern technology. However, McDonalds' reign over local restaurants was short-lived since the fast-food market started to expand and provide the same quality of service as McDonalds. The new options that arose nullified McDonald's genre proximity advantage. With economic reforms made by Deng Xiaoping, Chinese consumers changed their mindsets around foreign products being superior and started to shift towards local services. The new conditions negatively affected McDonald's business since they only had genre proximity to rely on and KFC was able to stay ahead of them with sales.

Operations
Sam Su is chairman and CEO of Yum!'s Chinese operations.

The Zinger burger is the highest selling menu item. KFC has adapted its menu to suit local tastes, with items such as rice congee, egg custard tarts and tree fungus salad, with an average of 50 different menu items per store. Another item is the Dragon Twister, a wrap that includes fried chicken, cucumbers, scallions, and duck sauce, similar in preparation to Peking duck.

Chinese outlets are typically two to three times larger than American and European outlets; many are open 24 hours a day and provide home delivery, and two new menu items are released each month. 78 percent of Chinese sites are company-owned, compared to 11 percent internationally.

Food Delivery

Convenience 
With China's online delivery services generating up to 45 billion USD in 2020, fast food chains like KFC were quick to introduce app-based ordering.   In 2015, white-collar workers made up 65% of food delivery app users and 30.5% were students. In 2020, white-collar workers make up 83% of the users and students only made up 11%.

Environmental Impacts 
The cost of convenience with these food delivery apps comes from the environment in the form of waste. With takeout becoming more popular, packing waste increased ninefold from 2015 to 2017. The plastic waste produced from takeouts are a source of concern, with China banning single-use plastics at the end of 2020 and calling for businesses to use sustainable packaging. Food delivery apps use vehicles to deliver food, so carbon emissions will also increase with the higher demands of food delivery. The most wasteful would have to be delivery from restaurants nearby.

Menu items

Current exclusive items on the KFC menu sold in China as of 2020 according to kfc.com.cn are listed below:

Burgers
Crispy Chicken Bafen Burger (脆鸡八分堡）
Zinger Burger (香辣鸡腿堡)
Extra Tasty Crispy Burger (劲脆鸡腿堡）
New Orleans Roasted Burger (新奥尔良烤鸡腿堡)
Bacon Chicken Burger (培根烤鸡腿堡)
BBQ Pulled Pork Burger (BBQ手撕猪肉堡)
Chicken & Shrimp Burger with Honey Mustard (伴鸡伴虾堡)

Twisters

Dragon Twister (老北京鸡肉卷)

Rice
Hot Spicy Chicken Rice (香辣鸡柳饭）
New Orleans Roasted Rice (新奥尔良烤鸡腿饭）
Teriyaki Chicken Chop Rice (香烤照鸡腿饭）

Snacks
Original Recipe Chicken (吮指原味鸡）
Hot Wings (香辣鸡翅) (2 pieces)
New Orleans Roasted Wings (新奥尔良烤翅) (2 pieces)
Thai Spicy Roaster Wings (泰式香辣烤翅）(2 pieces)
Chicken Nuggets (黄金鸡块) (5 pieces)
Popcorn chicken (劲爆鸡米花) (small and large)
French Fries (薯条) (small, medium and large)
Spicy Squid (辣小鲜鱿)
Flesh&Bone (骨肉相连)

Selected Catering
Egg & Vegetable Soup (芙蓉荟疏汤)（Off Shelf)
Mushroom Soup (菌菇四宝汤)
Corn Cob (香甜栗米棒)
Corn Salad (玉米沙拉）
Mashed Potato (士豆泥）

Desserts and Drinks
Oreo Floral Ice Cream (奥利奥花淇淋)
Taro Ball Floral Ice Cream (芋缘花淇淋)
Red Bean Pie (红豆派)
Portuguese Egg Tarts (葡式蛋挞) (classic)
Sundae (圣代) (chocolate and strawberry)
Ice Cream Cone (脆皮甜筒)
Pepsi Cola (百事可乐)
Sparkling Apple Juice Drink (苹果气泡果汁饮料)
9 Lives Juice Drink (九珍果汁饮料)
Ice Cream Float Coffee (雪顶咖啡)
Classic Milk Tea (香醇奶茶）(hot and iced)
Milk Tea with Red Bean and Stuffed Pearls (红豆圆奶茶）(iced)
Soy Milk (醇豆浆）
Hot Milk (热牛奶)
Classic Coffee (经典咖啡）
Americano (美式) (hot and iced)
Latte (拿铁) (hot and iced)
Cappuccino (卡布奇诺) (hot)
Mocha (摩卡) (hot)

References

Further reading
 Warren Liu. KFC: Secret Recipe for Success. Wiley. September 26, 2008.

External links

 Drewery, Hayden (University of North Florida). "West Meets East: KFC and Its Success in China." Armstrong Undergraduate Journal of History, Armstrong State University.

1987 introductions
1987 establishments in China
Fast-food chains of China
KFC by country